Results of the general election to the Municipal Council of Pajala Municipality, Sweden, held on Sunday 15 September 2002.

The election led to a coalition rule of the Social Democratic Party, the Christian Democrats and the Centre Party. The new chair of the executive committee was Social Democrat Bengt Niska.

See also 
Elections in Sweden
Swedish Election Authority
Politics of Sweden
List of political parties in Sweden

External links 
Swedish Election Authority - Official site

References 

Local and municipal elections in Sweden
2002 elections in Sweden
September 2002 events in Europe